Josef Dessauer (28 May 1798 in Prague – 8 July 1876 in Mödling, near Vienna), was an Austrian-born composer who wrote many popular songs, and also some less successful operas.

Life
Dessauer was born into a wealthy Jewish family, and studied piano in Prague with Bedřich Diviš Weber and composition with Wenzel Tomaschek. Dessauer began as a song composer, but later began composing operas, of which very few were performed.

In 1821 he settled in Vienna, from which he made many European tours. He was a friend of many composers of his time, such as Gioachino Rossini, Franz Schubert, Hector Berlioz, Felix Mendelssohn, Franz Liszt and Frédéric Chopin, who dedicated some pieces to him. He was also a friend of George Sand.

Operas
Lidwinna (1836)
Ein Besuch in Saint-Cyr (1838)
Paquita (1851)
Domingo (1860)
Oberon (which was never performed)

Songs
"Verschwiegenheit"
"Das Gebet"
"Wie Glücklich"
"Am Strande"
"Ich Denke Dein"
"Das Zerbrochene Ringlein"

1798 births
1876 deaths
Musicians from Prague
Austrian Romantic composers
Austrian opera composers
Male opera composers
Austrian Jews
Jewish classical composers
Jewish songwriters
19th-century classical composers
19th-century Czech male musicians